Kung Fu Zombie is a 1981 Hong Kong martial arts film written and directed by Hwa I Hung.  It stars Billy Chong as a martial artist who must fight supernatural foes.

Plot 
Pang, a martial artist, foils a robbery and sends thug Lu Dai to jail.  Desiring revenge, Lu returns to the town and hires Wu Lung, a Taoist priest, to raise several zombies to fight Pang.  The plan backfires when Lu is killed by his own trap.  His ghost then haunts the priest and demands to be resurrected.  Kwan Wei Long, a serial killer, enters the town looking to duel with Pang and is seemingly killed by him.  Happy to find a suitable corpse, Wu Lung attempts to put Lu Dai's spirit into Long's body.  Long, however, is so evil that he is reanimated as a free-willed vampire.  When Pang's father dies, the priest uses his corpse to host Lu's spirit, but the ceremony is interrupted, and the thug and Pang's father share control of the body.  Pang must now defeat the vampire and his father's possessed corpse.

Cast 
 Billy Chong as Pang
 Chan Lau as Wu Lung
 Chang Tao as Fong
 Cheng Ka Ying as Lu Dai
 Kwon Young Moon as Kwan Wei Long
 Pak Sha Lik
 Shum Yan Chi

Release 
Kung Fu Zombie was released in 1981 in Hong Kong and 1982 in the US.  Ground Zero released it in the US on DVD in 2002.

Reception 
J. Doyle Wallis of DVD Talk rated it 3.5/5 stars and called it "pure, cheap, unadulterated, stupid fun".  Todd Rigney of Beyond Hollywood called it "an obvious rip-off" of Encounters of the Spooky Kind that approaches the fun of The Evil Dead and Braindead.  In Horror and Science Fiction Films III, Donald C. Willis called it "95 minutes of pure silliness".  The Encyclopedia of Martial Arts Movies called it "a very unusual, funny film".  In The Zombie Movie Encyclopedia, Peter Dendle wrote, "The speeded-up cinematography of martial arts action sequences always gives zombies in East Asian cinema a novel, charismatic twist."  Brian Thomas, who wrote VideoHound's Dragon, said, "[F]or the most part, this has all the dumb spirit of a ninja movie with the added bonus of horror and gore!"

References

External links 
 

1981 films
1980s comedy horror films
1981 martial arts films
Hong Kong action comedy films
Hong Kong martial arts films
1980s Cantonese-language films
Hong Kong ghost films
Vampire comedy films
Zombie comedy films
1981 comedy films
1980s Hong Kong films